The Women's College National is a team handball tournament to determine the College National Champion from the US.

History
The best college team from the Women's National was claimed as collegiate champion from 1975 until 1996.
After the Olympic Games in 1996 in Atlanta the College Nationals were founded.

Record champion is the West Point with at minimum 19 titles. The college has also the most continuous titles with six from 2012 through 2017.

Results

Medal count

References

 Women's
Team Handball